Léon-Victor Dupré, a French landscape painter, was born at Limoges in 1816, and studied under his brother, Jules Dupré. He died in 1879, after a long and painful illness. Amongst his works are:

"Meadows in Berry".
"Environs of St. Julien".
"Cows Drinking " - 1855. (South Kensington Museum.)
"View at Argentan" - 1861.
"Landscape in the Indre" - 1864.

References
 

1816 births
1879 deaths
French landscape painters
People from Limoges
19th-century French painters
French male painters
19th-century French male artists